Death of a Ladies' Man may refer to:

Death of a Ladies' Man (album), a 1977 album by Leonard Cohen
Death of a Ladies' Man (novel), a 2009 novel by Alan Bissett
Death of a Ladies' Man, a 2012 novella by Christiana Spens
Death of a Ladies' Man (film), a 2020 film written and directed by Matt Bissonnette